Barito may refer to:
Barito River, a big drainage basin in South Kalimantan, Indonesia
Barito languages, around twenty Dayak (Austronesian) languages of Borneo, Southern Philippines. Also Malagasy, the national language of Madagascar. 
East Barito languages, group of a dozen Dayak (Austronesian) languages of Borneo
West Barito languages, group of half a dozen Dayak (Austronesian) languages of Borneo

See also 
Barito Kuala Regency, one of the regencies (kabupaten) in the Indonesian province of South Kalimantan including North Barito Regency and South Barito Regency
PS Barito Putera, Indonesian football club